The 2007 ABSA Currie Cup season was contested from June through to October. The Currie Cup is an annual domestic competition for provincial rugby union teams in South Africa. The competition was won by the Free State Cheetahs after they defeated the Golden Lions 20–18 in the final.

Standings

Updated 28 October 2007:

Points Breakdown
Four points for a win
Two points for a draw
One bonus point for a loss by seven points or less
One bonus point for scoring four or more tries in a match

Table Notes
P = points 
W = Won
D = Drawn
L = Lost
PF = points for
PA = Points Against
PD = Points Difference (PF – PA)
TF = Tries For
TA = Tries Against
BP = Bonus points
Pts = Total Points

Fixtures and results

Compulsory friendlies
Friday 13 July 2007 Leopards 20–17 Blue Bulls

Round one
Friday 22 June Blue Bulls 43–26 Falcons
Friday 22 June Free State Cheetahs 91–3 Boland Cavaliers
Saturday 23 June Western Province 18–13 Golden Lions

Round two
Friday 29 June Falcons 11–45 Free State Cheetahs
Saturday 30 June Boland Cavaliers 15–10 Western Province
Saturday 30 June Griquas 26–18 Blue Bulls
Saturday 30 June Golden Lions 14–0 The Sharks

Round three
 Friday 6 July The Sharks 32–16 Western Province
 Friday 6 July Falcons 33–39 Boland Cavaliers
 Saturday 7 July Free State Cheetahs 55–10 Griquas
 Saturday 7 July Blue Bulls 25–11 Golden Lions

Round four
 Saturday 14 July The Sharks 43–20 Griquas
 Friday 20 July Griquas 63–10 Falcons
 Saturday 21 July Golden Lions 11–27 Free State Cheetahs
 Saturday 21 July Boland Cavaliers 12–26 The Sharks
 Saturday 21 July Western Province 17–26 Blue Bulls

Round five
 Friday 27 July Falcons 5–62 Golden Lions
 Saturday 28 July Free State Cheetahs 45–13 Western Province
 Saturday 28 July The Sharks 29–10 Blue Bulls
 Saturday 28 July Griquas 43–32 Boland Cavaliers

Round six
 Friday 3 August Blue Bulls 36–12 Boland Cavaliers
 Saturday 4 August Western Province 47–18 Falcons
 Saturday 4 August Golden Lions 45–24 Griquas
 Saturday 4 August The Sharks 22–42 Free State Cheetahs

Round seven
 Friday 10 August Falcons 22–45 The Sharks
 Saturday 11 August Boland Cavaliers 10–15 Golden Lions
 Saturday 11 August Griquas 25–30 Western Province
 Saturday 11 August Free State Cheetahs 44–18 Blue Bulls

Round eight
 Friday 17 August Falcons 7–48 Blue Bulls
 Saturday 18 August Boland Cavaliers 20–22 Free State Cheetahs
 Saturday 18 August Griquas 14–24 The Sharks
 Saturday 18 August Golden Lions 19–16 Western Province

Round nine
 Friday 31 August Free State Cheetahs 80–33 Falcons
 Saturday 1 September Western Province 62–10 Boland Cavaliers
 Saturday 1 September Blue Bulls 46–3 Griquas
 Saturday 1 September The Sharks 21–3 Golden Lions

Round ten
 Friday 7 September Boland Cavaliers 24–20 Falcons
 Saturday 8 September Wilderklawer Griquas 17–21 Free State Cheetahs
 Saturday 8 September Golden Lions 27–22 Blue Bulls
 Saturday 8 September Western Province 22–19 The Sharks

Round eleven
 Friday 14 September The Sharks 50–25 Boland Cavaliers
 Saturday 15 September Falcons 25–65 Griquas
 Saturday 15 September Free State Cheetahs 24–19 Golden Lions
 Saturday 15 September Blue Bulls 35–10 Western Province

Round twelve
 Friday 21 September Blue Bulls 18–26 The Sharks
 Saturday 22 September Golden Lions 61–30 Falcons
 Saturday 22 September Boland Cavaliers 22–57 Griquas
 Saturday 22 September Western Province 34–20 Free State Cheetahs

Round thirteen
 Friday 28 September Falcons 23–46 Western Province
 Saturday 29 September Griquas 0–28 Golden Lions
 Saturday 29 September Boland Cavaliers 15–62 Blue Bulls
 Saturday 29 September Free State Cheetahs 25–23 The Sharks

Round fourteen
 Friday 5 October Free State Cheetahs 29–17 Blue Bulls
 Saturday 6 October Golden Lions 75–0 Boland Cavaliers
 Saturday 6 October The Sharks 43–29 Falcons
 Saturday 6 October Western Province 37–7 Griquas

Semi-finals
 Saturday 13 October The Sharks 12–19 Golden Lions
 Saturday 13 October Free State Cheetahs 11–6 Blue Bulls

Final

References

External links
 

 
2007
2007 in South African rugby union
2007 rugby union tournaments for clubs